Peppa's Adventures: The Album is the second album from cartoon character Peppa Pig. It was released by eOne Music on 30 July 2021, preceded by the singles "Bing Bong Champion" and "Peppa's Adventures".

Background
"Bing Bong Champion" was released as the album's lead single on 11 June 2021, with eOne Music announcing the release of Peppa's Adventures: The Album on the same day, to contain "10 all-new songs". The single was followed up by the release of "Peppa's Adventures" on 2 July 2021. All songs on the album were performed by Peppa Pig's voice actor, Amelie Bea Smith, 10 years old at the time of the album's release.

Critical reception

Writing for Pitchfork, Peyton Thomas called the album a "self-assured celebration of family, friendship, and muddy puddles". Thomas wrote that "Recycling" was reminiscent of Fiona Apple's work, and that both "The School Bus Song" and "Winter Days" introduce elements of "British and American folk music" to the album. However, Thomas opined that "Peppa's Adventures is most compelling when Peppa departs from her standard chamber-pop formula", citing "Bing Bong Champion" as "ambitiously maximalist" and "among her best work to date", comparing it to Taylor Swift's "State of Grace".

Track listing
Credits adapted from Tidal. All tracks are produced by Paul Moessl.

Release history

References

2021 albums
Children's music albums
Peppa Pig